The spouse of the deputy prime minister of Malaysia refers to the wife or husband of the Deputy Prime Minister of Malaysia. To date, twelve women and one man have held the title of the spouse of the deputy prime minister of Malaysia. The spouse of the present Deputy Prime Minister of Malaysia is Datin Sri Muhaini Zainal Abidin, with her husband, Ismail Sabri Yaakob was elected as Deputy Prime Minister of Malaysia on 7 July 2021.

List of spouses of deputy prime ministers of Malaysia

See also
 Spouse of the prime minister of Malaysia

References

 
Malaysia
Lists of Malaysian people